William Joseph Addison (born 20 August 1992) is an English-born Irish rugby union player who plays as a utility back for Ulster in the United Rugby Championship and European Rugby Champions Cup, and internationally for Ireland.

A product of the Sale Sharks academy, Addison made his club debut for Sale in 2010. He was part of the England U20 side which won the Junior Six Nations. He also featured at the 2012 Junior World Cup. He split time between his rugby career and studying for a degree in business studies, graduating in 2014. He was named the Sharks' captain ahead of the 2017-18 season, having previously captained the side in the absence of Josh Beaumont.

Addison is Irish-qualified through his Fermanagh-born mother, and grew up supporting Ireland. His contract with Sale contained an option to leave if an Irish team approached him, and he signed for Ulster ahead of the 2018–19 season in pursuit of his ambitions to play international rugby. He had a successful start to the season, initially at fullback, later at outside centre. On 24 October 2018, he was named in the Ireland squad for the November Internationals. On 3 November 2018 he made his debut for Ireland against Italy. He sustained a back injury in January 2019 that required surgery and kept him out for fifteen months. He returned to action in April 2021, before his season was ended by a red card for a dangerous tackle against Munster in May.

He started the 2021–22 season strongly, playing four games and scoring a try, before sustaining a fracture of the lower leg in October which again meant undergoing surgery.

References

External links
Ulster Rugby profile
United Rugby Championship profile

Ireland profile

1992 births
Living people
Alumni of the University of Manchester
English people of Irish descent
English rugby union players
Ireland international rugby union players
Irish rugby union players
People educated at Queen Elizabeth Grammar School, Penrith
Rugby union centres
Rugby union fullbacks
Rugby union players from Penrith, Cumbria
Rugby union wings
Sale Sharks players
Ulster Rugby players